William Keith Barnes AM (born 30 October 1934), also known by the nickname of "Golden Boots", is a Welsh-born Australian former rugby league footballer who played in the 1950s and 1960s, and coached in the 1960s, 1970s and 1980s. He played in 14 Tests between 1959 and 1966, as national captain on 12 occasions. He was known as "Golden Boots" due to his exceptional goal-kicking ability. After his playing days he became a referee and later co-commentated on the Amco Cup on Network Ten with Ray Warren in the 1970s. He is considered one of the nation's finest footballers of the 20th century.

Background
Barnes was born in Port Talbot, Wales.

Early years
Barnes' was 15 when his family emigrated to Australia in 1948 to Wollongong where Barnes learnt the game at Wollongong High School. He was graded by the Wollongong club at age 19 as a half-back and in 1954 represented for Country and in a Southern Districts side against the touring Great Britain Lions.

Club career
In 1955 he was signed by Norm "Latchem" Robinson to join the Balmain Tigers and moved to the district and straight into first grade, never playing a single lower grade game in the following 14 seasons. The following year he played in the first of three Grand Finals against the St George Dragons at the beginning of their long premiership reign. On three occasions 1956, 1964 and 1966 Keith Barnes would experience defeat in a premiership decider – the latter two as captain.

Barnes quickly became known for his deadly accurate goal-kicking and would often kick penalties from the further side of the 50-yard line. He once kicked eleven goals in a club match.

In 1966 he overtook Ron Willey's record for the most points scored in an NSWRFL career (1,288); Barnes' eventual total of 1,519 stood as the new career record for seven seasons until it was bettered by Eric Simms in 1973. Barnes' tally of 1,519 points for Balmain placed him (as of 2017) 19th on the all-time list of club pointscorers.

In his final playing year with Balmain in 1967, Barnes was captain-coach. He returned briefly for some match appearances in 1968 when the club's playing roster was depleted by injury.

Representative career

Barnes made his debut for New South Wales in 1956. His international debut was in the 1957 World Cup. He broke his cheekbone in the opening match of the series but stayed on field to kick five goals.

He made his Test debut against New Zealand in Brisbane in the second Test of the 1959 trans-Tasman series enjoying the rare distinction of captaining his country in his first Test appearance. He kicked seven goals in that outing and stayed on as fullback, goal kicker and captain for the third Test. He was then selected as captain for the 1959 Kangaroo tour and played as captain in all six Test matches and sixteen minor tour matches, kicking 101 goals on the tour. At the tail-end of the trip he appeared in two promotional games against Italy.

In 1960, Barnes led Australia in all three Tests of a domestic series against France. He enjoys the record of six career Test appearances against France, all as captain, for four wins, 1 draw and a loss. In the Brisbane second Test 55–6 victory Barnes kicked a Test record of 10 goals. He was then selected as captain-coach of the 1960 World Cup squad played in England. He appeared in Australia's second and third matches of the tournament with his representative rival Brian Carlson doing the goal-kicking.

Barnes returned to national honours in the second Test of the 1962 domestic series against Great Britain, his final Test as captain. Thereafter Australian selectors enjoyed a surfeit of talented young fullbacks to choose from and Ken Thornett and Les Johns were regularly selected until Graeme Langlands later became the incumbent. In 1966 however Barnes made two final representative appearances in the first and second Tests of the domestic Ashes series. He scored all of Australia's points in the second Test victory. Injury saw Les Johns take Barnes' spot for the third and he would not regain it.

Post playing
Barnes retired from competitive rugby league in 1968 having made seventeen appearances for his adopted country and 234 appearances for the Tigers in which he averaged four goals per game. After three unsuccessful Grand Final outings during his time, the Tigers ironically won their first premiership in twenty-one years in Barnes' first year after retirement –  1969.

He continued an active role in rugby league and in 1976 became Secretary-Manager of the Balmain Leagues Club and in 1984 took up the role of Chief Executive of the football club. Barnes was the first ex-Kangaroo captain to manage the Australian side on the 1990 Kangaroo tour. At the turn of the century Barnes was honoured with selection in the Balmain's 'Team of the Century' and in the Wests Tigers' 'Team of the Century'.  The yearly award for the best back at the Wests Tigers club is named the Keith Barnes Medal in his honour.

In 2007 he was inducted into the Australian Rugby League Hall of Fame. In February 2008, Barnes was named in the list of Australia's 100 Greatest Players (1908–2007) which was commissioned by the NRL and ARL to celebrate the code's centenary year in Australia.

On 26 January 1996, he was named a Member of the Order of Australia in "recognition service to rugby league as a player and administrator". On 24 October 2000, he was awarded the Australian Sports Medal for his rugby league achievements.

In 2009 Barnes was honoured with the naming of the Keith Barnes Stand at Leichhardt Oval, the Balmain Tigers' home ground.

Representative matches played

Sources
Whiticker, Alan (2004) Captaining the Kangaroos, New Holland, Sydney
 Andrews, Malcolm (2006) The ABC of Rugby League Austn Broadcasting Corpn, Sydney

References

External links
Wests Tigers team of the century

1934 births
Living people
Australia national rugby league team captains
Australia national rugby league team coaches
Australia national rugby league team players
Australian rugby league administrators
Australian rugby league coaches
Australian rugby league commentators
Australian rugby league players
Australian rugby league referees
Balmain Tigers captains
Balmain Tigers coaches
Balmain Tigers players
City New South Wales rugby league team players
Country New South Wales rugby league team players
Members of the Order of Australia
New South Wales rugby league team players
Recipients of the Australian Sports Medal
Rugby league fullbacks
Rugby league players from Port Talbot
Welsh emigrants to Australia